The One is the sixth studio album by American R&B recording artist Eric Benét. It was released on June 5, 2012 and marked Benét's debut release with his own label Jordan House Records and Primary Wave, following his departure from Reprise Records after the release of his previous album Lost in Time (2010). The singer worked with longtime collaborators George Nash, Jr. and Demonté Posey on the majority of the album. The One earned generally positive reviews from music critics and debuted and peaked at number 32 on the US Billboard 200. In 2014, Benét released a remix edition of the album, called The Other One, produced by German-Turkish DJ Afropeans.

Background 
The album is the follow-up to Benét's fifth studio album, Lost in Time (2010). The One marks a moment of positive transition in his life and lyrically speaks to the many new beginnings developing in his career and family. His first album released on Benét’s newly formed record label Jordan House Records, which he created in partnership with EMI, The One features his signature mid-70s soul groove, a variety of instruments from strings to horns to featured artists and even a duet with his first daughter India. “Real Love” was the first single off The One and was the #1 added song to Urban AC when shipped to radio in October 2011. This new single is a taste of what to expect on Benét’s new album, which he describes as a “very contemporary approach to old-school songwriting integrity”. His second single "Harriett Jones" released as a single on May 8, 2012, followed by a third "News For You" in November of that year. A remixed album The Other One later followed in 2014.

Critical reception

AllMusic's Andy Kellman rated the album three stars out of five and wrote: "While ballads like "Gonna Be My Girl" and "Lay It Down" sound closer to 2012 than 1972, and "Hope That It's You" sounds more like a guest appearance on a Shaggy album (rather than a Benét song featuring Shaggy), The One is another decent, retro-minded set from the veteran singer." SoulTracks editor Chris Rizik found that "this may be the best album Eric Benét has crafted since his benchmark introduction some 16 years ago as that young matinee idol tenor with the permanent five o’clock shadow [...] The One is the perfect portrait of Benet’s artistry. Its inviting lyrics of triumph, relationships, and love are also reflective of an artist, new husband and father who has learned some hard lessons about life and this business of music, only to finally find both his personal and creative lives right at home."

The Other One reissue 
In 2014, Benet teamed up with German-Turkish DJ and record producer Mousse T. to revisit and rework his 2012 release, adding new instrumentation and changing song structures into a more electronica feel. It received a Europe/Japan only release on May 16, 2014, with Mousse T. credited under his pseudonyme The Afropeans. Benét wanted to show his versatility and do something special for his international fans. It was led by the singles "Runnin'" and "Lay It Down."

Track listing 

Notes
  denotes additional producer

Personnel 
Credits for The One adapted from Allmusic.

 Jewel A – backing vocalist
 Kevin Arndt – assistant enginner
 Eric Benét – arranger
 Mike Bliesner – assistant engineer
 Phil Chen – guitar, strings
 Kevin "KD Davis – mixing
 Sean Erick – horns
 Denise Janae – backing vocalist
 Afton Johnson – backing vocalist, bass, keyboards
 Sean Jurewicz – assistant engineer
 Ken Krei – assistant engineer
 John Krovoza – strings
 Jeanie Lim – strings
 John Wesley "Stixx" McVicker, Jr. – drums
 Larry Mestel – management
 George Nash, Jr. – arranger, guitar, keyboards*
 Randee St. Nicholas – percussion 
 Rafael Padilla – percussion
 Demonte Posey – arranger
 Herb Powers, Jr. – management
 The Regiment Horns – arranger
 Jonathan Richmond – keyboards
 Jay Roach – pedal steel guitar 
 Dorrel Salmon – keyboards
 Ruzanna Sargsyan – strings
 Leon Silva – horns
 Ruslan Sirota – arranger, keyboards
 Kevin Sucher – keyboards, management
 Nella Tahriri – backing vocalist
 Denise Trotman – art direction
 Erick Walls – guitar
 Michael "Blue" Williams – management
 Kevin Williams – horns
 Curtis "Sauce" Wilson – drum programming
 Biju Zimmermann – assistant engineer

Charts

Weekly charts

Year-end charts

Release history

References

External links 
 

2012 albums
Eric Benét albums
EMI Records albums
Hip hop albums by American artists
Reggae fusion albums